Alfonso Vázquez de Acuña (died 1474) was a Roman Catholic prelate who served as Bishop of Jaén (1457–1474) and Bishop of Mondoñedo (1455–1457).

Biography
In 1455, Alfonso Vázquez de Acuña was appointed during the papacy of Pope Callixtus III as Bishop of Mondoñedo.
In 1457, he was appointed during the papacy of List of popes as Bishop of Jaén.
He served as Bishop of Jaén until his death in 1474.

References

External links and additional sources
 (for Chronology of Bishops) 
 (for Chronology of Bishops) 

15th-century Roman Catholic bishops in Castile
Bishops appointed by Pope Callixtus III
1474 deaths